Edward Tolfree (12 July 1881 – 20 March 1966) was an English first-class cricketer.

Tolfree made his first-class debut for Hampshire against the touring West Indians at the County Ground, Southampton. This was the only first-class match Tolfree played for Hampshire in the 1906 season. The following year Tolfeee represented Hampshire in a single first-class match, this time against Warwickshire.

Tolfree made two further appearances for the club in the 1909 season against Surrey and Leicestershire. These were the last fixtures Tolfree played for the club before the First World War.

Following the end of the war, Tolfree played his final first-class match for Hampshire in the 1919 County Championship against Middlesex. Tolfree's five first-class matches for Hampshire were spread over a thirteen-year period, in them he scored 53 runs at a batting average of 8.83 and made a high score of 22*. With the ball Tolfree took 2 wickets at an expensive average of 92.50.

Tolfree died at West End, Hampshire on 20 March 1966.

External links
Edward Tolfree at Cricinfo
Edward Tolfree at CricketArchive

1881 births
1966 deaths
Cricketers from Southampton
English cricketers
Hampshire cricketers